Laetiporus portentosus is a species of polypore fungus in the family Fomitopsidaceae. It is found in South America, Australia, and New Zealand. It has been used traditionally as a tinder and to carry fire by Australian Aboriginals, and by New Zealand Māori people. The Māori have also used it as a "wound protector, to soften and ease a difficult labor."

The white-throated treecreeper (Cormobates leucophaea) has been recorded feeding on this fungus in a heathy dry forest in Victoria.

Taxonomy
The fungus was first described in 1844 by English mycologist Miles Joseph Berkeley.  Mario Rajchenberg  transferred it to the genus Laetiporus in 1995. The fungus has acquired an extensive synonymy in the interim:
Polyporus portentosus Berk. (1844)
Ungulina portentosa (Berk.) Pat. (1906)
Piptoporus portentosus (Berk.) G. Cunn. (1965)
Polyporus eucalyptorum Fr. (1846)
Ungulina eucalyptorum (Fr.) Pat. (1906)
Piptoporus eucalyptorum (Fr.) Warcup (1986)
Polyporus leucocreas Cooke (1879)
Polyporus spermolepidis Pat. (1898)
Ungulina spermolepidis (Pat.) Pat. (1906) 
Ungulina spermolepidis var. pandani Pat. (1906)
Polyporus spermolepidis var. pandani (Pat.) Sacc. & Trotter (1912)
Polyporus albofuscus Lloyd (1924)
Durogaster albus Lloyd (1924)

References

Fungi described in 1844
Fungi of Australia
Fungi of New Zealand
Fungi of South America
Fungal plant pathogens and diseases
portentosus
Taxa named by Miles Joseph Berkeley